The term "Aladura" means "praying person" in Yoruba. Aladura is a classification of indigenous churches in south-western Nigeria that started in the early 20th century. These churches believe in the efficacy of prayers and practical guidance by God through the Holy Spirit in all its programs.

The main Aladura churches can be distinguished by the distinct apostolic way, the church founders were called directly by Christ himself. Jesus Christ emphasized: my house shall be called the house of prayer. 

Aladura churches emphasize the power of prayer and the word of God (both the Bible and the living voice of God).  

They believe in holiness. The yoruba term for this: is "ijo-mimo". Aladura churches are Evangelicals and various elements associated with Pentecostalism can be found in Aladura churches.  

Most of the pioneer founders in the early 20th century were initially Anglicans and Methodists. They rejected the power of traditional African religion as malign. They also opposed many dominant practices then such as: both polygamy and witchcraft and focus instead on the "holiness movement". 

Today, many churches in Nigeria can be called "Aladura", since they have been influenced by this movement.

Divisions 

The main Aladura churches with their founders are:

Pre-1960 Aladura 
Some of the pre-1960s Aladura churches are also called "White Garment" churches.

Moses Orimolade,

 Cherubim and Seraphim C&S

David O. Odunbanjo, Joseph Sadare, Oba Babalola Akinyele, Sophia Odunlami, and many others 

 The Apostolic Church of Nigeria TAC (initially, Faith Terbanacle Church of Nigeria)

Joseph A. Babalola,

Christ Apostolic Church CAC

SBJ Oschoffa,

 Celestial Church of Christ CCC

Post-1960 Aladura 
J.O. Akindayomi, 
Redeemed Christian Church of God RCCG
W.F. Kumuyi
Deeper Life Bible Church DLBC

Post-2000 Aladura 
Michael C. Egbo
 Kings Apostolic Christ Evangelical Mission KACEM

Pre-1960 Aladura

Eternal Sacred Order of Cherubim and Seraphim

Moses Orimolade Tunolase, who was later called Baba Aladura, or Praying Father, founded the Eternal Sacred Order of Cherubim and Seraphim in 1925, also as a prayer group within the Anglican Church. Captain Christiana Abiodun's adopted daughter fell into a trance and Moses Orimolade Tunolase, who was already an itinerant evangelist and teacher, was the only one who could awaken her. By 1925 they had left the Anglican church to become independent. Their most distinctive ministry was to openly identify and challenge witches on evangelistic journeys through the countryside. These long trips were typical of Cherubim and Seraphim (as they are most commonly called) evangelists and missionaries. Today the church is one of the most popular, most attractive and most influential of the Aladura churches worldwide.

The Apostolic Church and Christ Apostolic Church

The first Aladura movement emerged from St. Saviour's Anglican Church, Ijebu-Ode, Nigeria in 1918. The Sexton, Ali, related a dream to four church elders, J.B. Sadare, E.O. Onabanjo, D.C. Oduga and E.O.W. Olukoya. They started vigorous prayer sessions. They initiated the "Prayer Band", popularly called "Egbe Aladura". After D.O. Odubanjo joined the movement in 1919, they became influenced by the doctrines of the Faith Tabernacle of Philadelphia. They rejected infant baptism and all forms of medicine, whether western or traditional. This led to a doctrinal conflict with the Anglican Church and they were forced out of the church. Joseph Sadare was compelled to give up his post in the Synod and others were forced to resign their jobs and to withdraw their children from the Anglican School. The Aladura movement began as a renewal movement in search of true spirituality.

A revival took place in 1918 during the influenza pandemic. The group filled with the Holy Ghost claim to have used prayer to save many lives affected by the epidemic. This consolidated the prayer group. The movement grew gradually and formed branches throughout Nigeria. The name of the group went through several changes, such as Prayer Band, Precious Stone, Diamond Society, and Faith Tabernacle, in that order, until 1930. A great revival started in July 1930 by the raising of a dead body by Apostle Joseph Ayo Babalola at Oke-Oye in Ilesa. People traveled from neighboring cities and countries to receive healing at Ilesa. Several people were healed through the power of prayer amid evidence of the baptism of the Holy Spirit. The revival lasted about 60 days and is regarded as the greatest revival ever in Nigeria. Faith Tabernacle of Nigeria later invited the Apostolic Church of England in 1931 to form an Association that lasted until 1939.

The Revival group went through additional name changes until, 24 years after its formation, it settled on the name Christ Apostolic Church (CAC) in 1942. Today, CAC has spread worldwide and is the precursor of Aladura Pentecostal Churches in Nigeria. The Church established schools at all levels, including Joseph Ayo Babalola University.

Celestial Church of Christ

The Celestial Church of Christ (usually known as Cele) was founded in 1947 by Samuel Oshoffa in Porto Novo, Benin.

See also

Celestial Church of Christ
Church of the Lord (Aladura)
Christ Apostolic Church
African Initiated Church

References

African initiated churches
Christianity in Nigeria
Pentecostalism in Africa
Religious organizations established in the 1920s
Christian new religious movements
1918 establishments in Nigeria